Sarvestan is a city in Fars Province, Iran.

Sarvestan may also refer to these places in Iran:

 Sarvestan, Bushehr
 Sarvestan, Bavanat, Fars Province
 Sarvestan, Bam, Kerman Province
 Sarvestan County, in Fars Province
 Sarvestan Palace, in Fars Province
 Sarvestan Rural District (disambiguation), in Fars Province